Cypress Ridge High School is a public secondary school located in unincorporated Harris County, Texas, near Houston. It was established in 2002 as Cypress-Fairbanks Independent School District High School #7.  Cypress Ridge provides the deaf education program for Cy Fair ISD and surrounding school districts.

It serves Lakes on Eldridge.

History
In 2016 a section of the Jersey Village High School attendance boundary was reassigned to Cypress Ridge. This occurred as part of a wave of high school rezoning.

Academics
For the 2018–2019 school year, the school received a B grade from the Texas Education Agency, with an overall score of 88 out of 100. The school received a B grade in each of the three performance domains, with a score of 88 for Student Achievement, 87 for School Progress, and 87 for Closing the Gaps. The school received four of the seven possible distinction designations for Academic Achievement in Mathematics, Academic Achievement in English Language Arts/Reading, Post-Secondary Readiness, and Top 25%: Comparative Closing the Gaps.

Feeder patterns

Schools that feed into Cypress Ridge include:
Elementary schools: Bane, Emmott, Kirk, Bang (partial), Danish (partial), Francone (partial), Hairgrove (partial), Holbrook (partial), Lee (partial), Post (partial), Willbern (partial)
Middle schools: Campbell (partial), Dean (partial), Truitt (partial)

Notable alumni
 Kovid Gupta, Author of  Kingdom of The Soap Queen: The Story of Balaji Telefilms
 Awsten Knight, Lead singer of Waterparks
 Russell Shepard, Former NFL Wide Receiver
 Willie Wright, Former NFL offensive guard for the Cleveland Browns and Atlanta Falcons

References

External links

Cypress Ridge High School Alumni Website
Cypress-Fairbanks Independent School District Website

Cypress-Fairbanks Independent School District high schools
Public education in Houston
2002 establishments in Texas
Educational institutions established in 2002